Tazrak (also Romanized as Ţazrak; also known as Tajārak and Ţazarak) is a village in Qaleh Hashem Rural District, Shal District, Buin Zahra County, Qazvin Province, Iran. At the 2006 census, its population was 1,619, in 431 families.

References 

Populated places in Buin Zahra County